Panjshir University is located in  Panjshir province, northern Afghanistan. . Panjshir university has faculties of Economics, Agriculture and Education.

Departments of Faculty of Education:
  Biology
  Chemistry
  Maths
  Geography
  English
  Islamic Culture
  Arts
  Computer
  Vocational Studies

See also 
List of universities in Afghanistan

References

Universities in Afghanistan
University